Badminton at the 2009 East Asian Games was held at Hong Kong in the month of December. Competitions for five individual disciplines as well as for Men's and Women's team competitions was conducted. China stood first in the tally by winning three out of seven gold medals while Chinese Taipei, South Korea, Macau and Hong Kong won one gold medals respectively.

Medal summary

Medal table

Medalists

Results

Men's singles

Women's singles

Men's doubles

Women's doubles

Mixed doubles

References 

Badminton at the East Asian Games
2009 in badminton
2009 in Hong Kong sport
Badminton in Hong Kong
International sports competitions hosted by Hong Kong